Eva-Maria Liimets (born 31 May 1974) is an Estonian politician. She served as the Minister of Foreign Affairs in the cabinet of Prime Minister Kaja Kallas. She was nominated by the Estonian Centre Party as an independent in January 2021 and officially joined the party on 9 June 2021. Along with all seven cabinet ministers of the governing coalition’s junior partner, she was dismissed on 3 June 2022.

Early life
She has a degree in public administration from the University of Tartu and a master’s degree in international business management (MBA) from the Estonian Business School. She is a graduate of the 19th International Training Course in Security Policy at the Geneva Centre for Security Policy (GCSP).

Civil service

She served as Estonia's ambassador to the Czech Republic with credentials also to Slovenia and Croatia.

Minister of Foreign Affairs (2021-2022)
Shortly after Liimets took office, the foreign ministry announced an "arctic month" starting from 28 January 2021, amid plans by Estonia to apply for observer status at the Arctic Council in 2021. "Developments in the Arctic should be a concern for everyone, as the climate change there affects the whole world," Liimets said.

References

External links 
 Eva-Maria Liimets, Estonia Government

Living people
1974 births
Politicians from Tallinn
Women government ministers of Estonia
21st-century Estonian politicians
21st-century Estonian women politicians
Ministers of Foreign Affairs of Estonia
Female foreign ministers
Ambassadors of Estonia to Croatia
Ambassadors of Estonia to the Czech Republic
Ambassadors of Estonia to Slovenia
University of Tartu alumni
20th-century Estonian women